Fort Randolph may refer to:

 Fort Randolph (Pineville, Louisiana), listed on the National Register of Historic Places
 Fort Randolph (Tennessee), a Confederate Civil War fortification in Randolph, Tennessee
 Fort Randolph (West Virginia), a 1785 Revolutionary War fortification at Point Pleasant, West Virginia
 Fort Randolph (Panama), a Coast Artillery Corps fort